Chaouki Ben Saada (born 1 July 1984) is a former professional footballer who played as a midfielder and forward. Born in France, he formerly played for the Tunisia national team.

Club career
Born in Bastia, France, Ben Saada made 170 appearances for Bastia, scoring 16 goals for the team.

On 2 July 2008, he signed with Ligue 1 side OGC Nice for €1.5 million along with teammate Kafoumba Coulibaly, agreeing to a three-year contract.

After a three-year stint with Nice, he signed a two-year deal with Ligue 2 outfit RC Lens on 24 August 2011.

In August 2012, Ben Saada moved to Ligue 2 club Arles-Avignon on a two-year contract. In October 2014, he then signed a one-year contract with Troyes AC, extending his stay in the Ligue 2.

International career
Ben Saada played international football for France at youth level, earning an Under-17 World Championship medal in 2001. Since then, he adopted the Tunisian nationality of his parents, and first played for the national side in March 2005. He has won 12 international caps, scoring 1 goal (as of 7 June 2006). He was in the Tunisian squad for the 2006 African Cup of Nations, but was initially omitted from the squad for 2006 World Cup, before being called up to replace Issam Jomaa, who withdrew with a knee injury.

Career statistics

International goals
Scores and results list Tunisia's goal tally first, score column indicates score after each Ben Saada goal.

References

External links

FFF Profile

1984 births
Living people
Sportspeople from Bastia
Citizens of Tunisia through descent
Tunisian footballers
Tunisia international footballers
French footballers
France youth international footballers
Association football midfielders
French sportspeople of Tunisian descent
2005 FIFA Confederations Cup players
2006 FIFA World Cup players
2006 Africa Cup of Nations players
2008 Africa Cup of Nations players
2010 Africa Cup of Nations players
SC Bastia players
OGC Nice players
RC Lens players
AC Arlésien players
ES Troyes AC players
Ligue 1 players
Ligue 2 players
Footballers from Corsica